FC Lokomotíva Košice is a Slovak football club, playing in the town of Košice. The club was founded in 1946 and played for 29 years in the Czechoslovak First League.

The club also had several appearances in Europe playing the UEFA Cup Winners' Cup 1977-78 and the UEFA Cup 1978-79.

Club history
In 1951–1952 and 1977–1978 seasons, the club ranked 3rd in the Czechoslovak First League. In the 1977–1978 season the team also won the Czechoslovak Cup.

The last major success of the club until the present time was winning the Slovak Cup in the 1984–1985 season. Season 1985–1986 was the last for the club in the Czechoslovak First League. That season the team finished next to last, 15th place in the league and relegated to the 2nd division.

After the disintegration of Czechoslovakia, the club took part in the Corgoň Liga. In the 1993–1994 season took 8th place out of 12 participants. In the 1997–1998 season, finishing next to last, 15th place, relegated to the second league. In the 1999–2000 season in the second division championship club finished 17th place and relegated to the third division. In the 2003–2004 season was dropped to the 4th division.

They withdrew from the 2018-19 2. liga season due to financial problems

Club's name

 1946 - ŠK Železničiari Košice
 1946 - ŠK Železničiari Sparta Košice
 1949 - ZSJ Dynamo ČSD Košice
 1952 - TJ Lokomotíva Košice
 1965 - TJ Lokomotíva VSŽ Košice
 1967 - TJ Lokomotíva Košice
 1990 - FK Lokomotíva Košice
 1994 - FK Lokomotíva Energogas Košice
 1997 - FC Lokomotíva Košice
 1999 - FC Spoje Lokomotíva Košice
 2005 - FC Lokomotíva Košice

Stadium
Initially Lokomotíva played at Lokomotíva Stadium in the Čermeľ district for most of its history (until 1997). Now Lokomotíva plays in small village Družstevná pri Hornáde 16 km far from city center of Košice. As of 2021, Lokomotíva plays in Barca, municipal district of Košice.

Honours

Domestic
 Czechoslovakia
 Czechoslovak First League (1925–93)
  Third place (2): 1951, 1977–78
 Czechoslovak Cup (1961–1993)
  Winners (2): 1977, 1979
 Slovakia
 Slovak Cup (1961–)
  Winners (3): 1977, 1979, 1985
  Runners-Up (2): 1961, 1992

Czechoslovak and Slovak Top Goalscorer
The Czechoslovak League top scorer from 1944–45 until 1992–93. Since the 1993–94 Slovak League Top scorer.

1Shared award

Results

League and domestic cup history
Slovak League only (1993-present)

European competition history

Current squad
As of September 19, 2019.

Technical staff

Player records

Most appearances

Most goals

Notable players
Had international caps for their respective countries. Players whose name is listed in bold represented their countries while playing for Lokomotiva.

Past (and present) players who are the subjects of Wikipedia articles can be found here.
	
 Bohumil Andrejko
 Pavol Biroš
 Ivan Čabala
 Matúš Čonka
 Pavol Diňa
 Gejza Farkaš
 František Feczko
 Anton Flešár
 Milan Gigler
 Miroslav Greskovics
 Andrej Iľko
 Július Holeš
 Ladislav Józsa
 Karol Kisel
 Ján Kozák sr.
 František Kunzo
 Ján Luža
 František Matys
 Jozef Móder
 Martin Obšitník
 Erik Pačinda
 Ladislav Putyera
 Stanislav Seman
 Adolf Scherer
 Viliam Schrojf
 Miroslav Sovič
 Stanislav Strapek
 Anton Šoltis
 Peter Štyvar
 Rudolf Urban
 Blažej Vaščák
 Rudolf Zibrínyi
 Ľudovít Žitňár

Notable managers

  Michal Baránek (1972)
  Ladislav Kačáni (1972-1974)
  Jozef Jankech (1975-1976)
  Michal Baránek (1976-1978)
  Jozef Jankech (1978-1980)
  Jozef Jankech (1983-1985)
  Michal Baránek (1985-1986)
  Jaroslav Galko (2013-2014)
  Dušan Ujhely (2014-2015)
  Branislav Sokoli (2015-2016)
  Albert Rusnák (2016-2018)
  Ľuboš Benkovský (2018-2019)
  Dušan Ujhely (2019-2020)
  Milan Lalkovič (2020-)

References

Bibliography

External links 

 
  

 
Kosice, Lokomotiva FC
Sport in Košice
Kosice, Lokomotiva FC
Association football clubs established in 1946
1946 establishments in Slovakia
Lokomotíva Košice